Edward & Mrs. Simpson is a seven-part British television series that dramatises the events leading to the 1936 abdication of King Edward VIII, who gave up his throne to marry the twice-divorced American Wallis Simpson.

The series, made by Thames Television for ITV, was originally broadcast in 1978. Edward Fox played Edward, and Cynthia Harris portrayed Mrs. Simpson. The series was scripted by Simon Raven, based on Fox's maternal aunt Frances Donaldson's biography of the King, Edward VIII. It was produced by Andrew Brown, overseen by Head of Drama Thames Television Verity Lambert and directed by Waris Hussein. The incidental music was by Ron Grainer.

The series, broadcast in the US in 1979 as instalments of the nationally syndicated Mobil Showcase Network, won the 1980 Emmy award for Outstanding Limited Series, and BAFTA Awards in 1979 for Best Actor, Best Design, Best Costume Design, and Best Series or Serial. It has been released on DVD in Region 2 (UK) by Network, and in Region 1 (United States) by A&E.

Episodes 
 "The Little Prince": Edward's life in the 1920s as Prince of Wales, his romances with Freda Dudley Ward and Lady Furness, his introduction to Mr. and Mrs. Ernest Simpson. There is a slight historical query as the first official meeting of Edward and Mrs Simpson took place at Burrough Court near Melton Mowbray, Leicestershire, on Saturday 10 January 1931. The episode suggests a short meeting took place at the London residence of Lady Furness in the Autumn of 1930 (which is not documented and therefore cannot be proved).
 "Venus at the Prow": The romance between Edward and Mrs. Simpson develops.
 "The New King": Edward succeeds to the throne upon the death of his father, King George V, in January, 1936, and asks Mrs. Simpson to marry him. Mr. Simpson agrees to a divorce. The King, Mrs. Simpson, and friends cruise the Mediterranean, an event widely reported by the press outside England.
 "The Divorce": Edward convinces Mrs. Simpson to go forward with her divorce; she would then be free to marry him and be crowned Queen at the coronation scheduled for May, 1937. The King and the government pressure the British press to maintain silence about the King's romance, but news dribbles into Britain and gossip abounds. The New York Journal breaks the story "King will wed Wally".
 "The Decision": Edward is warned that British press silence about his 'friendship' with Mrs. Simpson is about to be broken. The King tells the royal family and the Prime Minister that he intends to marry Wallis Simpson, and will abdicate if he cannot do so as King.
 "Proposals": Attempts are made to resolve the problem without Edward's abdicating, including a proposal put forth by the King for a morganatic marriage with Wallis Simpson. The British and Commonwealth governments oppose the marriage in any form.
 "The Abdication": The final days of Edward as King. The signing of the Abdication on 10 December 1936 at Fort Belvedere. The radio broadcast to the nation on 11 December 1936 from the Augusta Tower, Windsor Castle. The marriage of Edward and Mrs Simpson on 3 June 1937.

Music 
In 1978, RK Records released an official soundtrack album (UK cat No: RKLP 5003). It had 12 tracks, some composed or arranged by Ron Grainer and all played by his orchestra. The track listing is as follows:

Side one
 "I've Danced with a Man" (Herbert Farjeon)
 "The Very Thought of You" (Ray Noble)
 "A Room with a View" (Noël Coward)
 "If I Had You" (Al Bowlly)
 "Of Cabbages and Kings"
 "Bring Down the Curtain"

Side two
 "One More Dance"
 "Dance Little Lady" (Coward)
 "Tango"
 "When Love Grows Cold"
 "Rumours in the Wind"
 "I've Danced with a Man" (End Titles/Reprise) (Farjeon)

The theme music used for the opening and closing titles was a composite of Herbert Farjeon's 1927 song "I've danced with a man, who's danced with a girl, who's danced with the Prince of Wales" and the opening of the British national anthem "God Save the King." The vocalist for "I've Danced with a Man", "Bring Down the Curtain" and "One More Dance" is Jenny Wren.

Al Bowlly's original recordings of "Isn't It Heavenly" and "Love Is the Sweetest Thing" are also used in the series.

The soundtrack album was produced and engineered by Barry Kingston for Robert Kingston Productions Ltd.

Cast 
 Edward Fox as King Edward VIII
 Cynthia Harris as Wallis Simpson
 David Waller as Stanley Baldwin
 Nigel Hawthorne as Walter Monckton
 Peggy Ashcroft as Queen Mary
 Marius Goring as King George V
 Cherie Lunghi as Lady Thelma Furness
 Kika Markham as Freda Dudley Ward
 Jessie Matthews as Aunt Bessie Merryman
 Charles Keating as Ernest Simpson
 Andrew Ray as the Duke of York
 Amanda Reiss as the Duchess of York
 John Shrapnel as Alexander Hardinge
 Maurice Denham as Cosmo Lang, Archbishop of Canterbury
 Ed Devereaux as Lord Beaverbrook
 Geoffrey Lumsden as Geoffrey Dawson
 Patrick Troughton as Clement Attlee
 Trevor Bowen as Duff Cooper
 Patricia Hodge as Lady Diana Cooper
 Elsie Randolph as Lady Sibyl Colefax
 Bessie Love as Emerald (Maud) Cunard
 Tony Church as Sir Samuel Hoare
 Wensley Pithey as Winston Churchill
 Gary Waldhorn as Chips Channon
 Hugh Fraser as Anthony Eden

Production 
The series was made by Thames Television, part of the ITV network, at its Teddington Studios.

Response 
The series was produced and aired during the Duchess of Windsor's lifetime and though becoming increasingly ill, it is reported she found the series to be a gross invasion of her privacy. Her requests to be sent a copy of the script were apparently ignored and she received an amount of correspondence from people who said they would not watch the series.

References 
Citations

Bibliography

External links 
 
 British Film Institute Screen Online

1978 British television series debuts
1978 British television series endings
1970s British drama television series
1970s British television miniseries
ITV television dramas
Television series set in the 20th century
Films directed by Waris Hussein
Cultural depictions of the Edward VIII abdication crisis
Primetime Emmy Award for Outstanding Miniseries winners
Cultural depictions of George V
Cultural depictions of George VI
Television shows produced by Thames Television
English-language television shows
Cultural depictions of Stanley Baldwin
Cultural depictions of Winston Churchill
Television shows shot at Teddington Studios